The 2020 Rally Turkey (also known as Marmaris Rally Turkey 2020) was a motor racing event for rally cars that held between 18 and 20 September 2020. It marked the thirteenth running of Rally Turkey and was the fifth round of the 2020 World Rally Championship, World Rally Championship-2 and World Rally Championship-3.

Sébastien Ogier and Julien Ingrassia were the defending rally winners. Citroën World Rally Team, the team they drove for in 2019, were the reigning manufacturers' winners, but they did not defending their title after parent company Citroën withdrew from the sport. Gus Greensmith and Elliott Edmondson were the defending winners in the World Rally Championship-2 category, but they did not defend their titles as they were promoted to the sport's top tier by M-Sport Ford World Rally Team. In the World Rally Championship-3 category, Kajetan Kajetanowicz and Maciej Szczepaniak were the reigning rally winners.

Elfyn Evans and Scott Martin were the overall winners of the rally, recording a second win of the season. Their team, Toyota Gazoo Racing WRT, were the manufacturers' winners. The Toksport WRT crew of Pontus Tidemand and Patrik Barth won the WRC-2 category. Kajetan Kajetanowicz and Maciej Szczepaniak successfully defended their tiles in the WRC-3 category.

Background

Championship standings prior to the event
Six-time world champions Sébastien Ogier and Julien Ingrassia entered the round with a nine-point lead over Elfyn Evans and Scott Martin. Reigning world champions Ott Tänak and Martin Järveoja were third, a further four points behind. In the World Rally Championship for Manufacturers, Toyota Gazoo Racing WRT held a five-point lead over defending manufacturers' champions Hyundai Shell Mobis WRT, following by M-Sport Ford WRT.

In the World Rally Championship-2 standings, Mads Østberg and Torstein Eriksen held a twenty-point lead ahead of Pontus Tidemand and Patrick Barth in the drivers' and co-drivers' standings respectively, with Nikolay Gryazin and Renaud Jamoul in third. In the manufacturer' championship, Hyundai Motorsport N led PH-Sport by nine points. M-Sport Ford WRT sit in third, a slender five points behind.

In the World Rally Championship-3 standings, the crew of Jari Huttunen and Mikko Lukka led both drivers' and co-drivers' championships by six and eight points over 	Marco Bulacia Wilkinson and Aaron Johnston respectively. Oliver Solberg was third in the drivers' standings, while Yannick Roche held third in the co-drivers' standings.

Entry list
The following crews entered into the rally. The event was open to crews competing in the World Rally Championship, its support categories, the World Rally Championship-2, World Rally Championship-3 and privateer entries that were not registered to score points in any championship. Twenty-six entries were received, with ten crews entered in World Rally Cars, three Group R5 cars entered in the World Rally Championship-2 and twelve in the World Rally Championship-3.

Route

Itinerary
All dates and times are TRT (UTC+3).

Report

World Rally Cars
Sebastien Loeb and Daniel Elena held the lead going onto Saturday. At the age of forty-six, Loeb became the oldest driver to lead a WRC event. Ott Tänak and Martin Järveoja retired Friday when their Hyundai speared off the road because of a steering issue. Sebastien Ogier and Julien Ingrassia took over the lead on Saturday morning, but they dropped their lead to Thierry Neuville and Nicolas Gilsoul in the afternoon loop due to a puncture and hydraulics issue. Sunday's first pass through the Çetibeli stage saw tyre dramas, which saw five crews suffering punctures, including the crew of Neuville and Gilsoul, Loeb and Elena, Ogier and Ingrassia, Kalle Rovanperä and Jonne Halttunen, and Esapekka Lappi and Janne Ferm, with two more crews retired from the rally. Ogier and Ingrassia then retired from the rally when their engine was on fire. Eventually, the rally was won by Elfyn Evans and Scott Martin.

Classification

Special stages

Championship standings

World Rally Championship-2
Adrien Fourmaux and Renaud Jamoul claimed back-to-back stage wins to lead the class on Friday, but a rear-left puncture in Saturday afternoon cost them the lead. Pontus Tidemand and Patrick Barth took over the lead and won the class.

Classification

Special stages

Championship standings

World Rally Championship-3
Marco Bulacia Wilkinson and Marcelo Der Ohannesian led the class through Friday. Sean Johnston and Alex Kihurani retired from the rally when their Citroën caught fire. Kajetan Kajetanowicz and Maciej Szczepaniak set some blistering times, opening a huge gap to comfortably win the rally.

Classification

Special stages

Championship standings

Notes

References

External links
  
 2020 Rally Turkey at ewrc-results.com
 The official website of the World Rally Championship

Turkey
2020 in Turkish motorsport
September 2020 sports events in Turkey
2020